The Black Book is a 2018 Portuguese drama film directed by Valeria Sarmiento. It was screened in the Contemporary World Cinema section at the 2018 Toronto International Film Festival and in competition at the San Sebastián International Film Festival.

Cast
 Lou de Laâge as Laura / Lelia
 Stanislas Merhar as Rufo
 Niels Schneider as Marquis Lusault
 Jenna Thiam as Suzanne Monfort
 Daniela Melchior as La Fille

References

External links
 

2018 films
2018 drama films
Films directed by Valeria Sarmiento
Portuguese drama films
2010s French-language films
Films based on Portuguese novels
Films produced by Paulo Branco